{{Infobox settlement
| name                            = Derajat
| elevation_footnotes             = 
| population_demonym              = 
| population_density_km2          = 
| population_as_of                = 
| population_total                = 
| population_footnotes            = 
| elevation_m                     = 
| dimensions_footnotes            = 
| timezone1                       = Pakistan Standard Time
| area_water_km2                  = 
| area_land_km2                   = 
| area_total_km2                  = 
| area_rank                       = 
| area_water_percent              = 
| area_note                       = 
| area_magnitude                  = 
| population_note                 = 
| utc_offset1                     = 
| area_rural_footnotes            = 
| demographics_type1              = Demographics
| website                         = 
| demographics1_info2             = PashtoSaraiki, Urdu, Hindko, Balochi
| demographics1_title2            = Languages
| demographics2_footnotes         = 
| demographics1_info1             = Saraikis, Balochs<small>Minor: Pashtuns
| demographics1_title1            = Ethnic groups
| demographics1_footnotes         = 
| blank_info                      = 

| timezone1_DST                   = 
| blank_name                      = Largest cities
| iso_code                        = 
| area_code                       = 
| area_code_type                  = 
| postal_code                     = 
| postal_code_type                = 
| utc_offset1_DST                 = 
| area_metro_footnotes            = 
| area_urban_footnotes            = 
| native_name                     = درجات
| nickname                        = 
| pushpin_map_alt                 = 
| pushpin_label_position          = 
| pushpin_map                     = 
| map_caption                     =
| map_alt                         = 
| image_map                       =
| motto                           = 
| shield_alt                      = 
| coordinates                     = 
| image_shield                    = 
| seal_alt                        = 
| image_seal                      = 
| flag_alt                        = 
| image_flag                      = 
| settlement_type                 = Region
| native_name_lang                = ps
| pushpin_map_caption             = 
| subdivision_type                = Provinces
| area_footnotes                  = 
| founder                         = 
| unit_pref                       = 
| leader_name                     = 
| leader_title                    = 
| leader_party                    = 
| government_footnotes            = 
| seat                            = 
| seat_type                       = 
| established_date                = 
| subdivision_name                =  Balochistan Khyber Pakhtunkhwa Punjab
| established_title               = 
| subdivision_name3               = 
| subdivision_type3               = 
| subdivision_name2               = 
| subdivision_type2               = 
| subdivision_name1               = 
| subdivision_type1               = 
| footnotes                       = 
}}

Derajat, the plural of the word 'dera', is a cultural region of central Pakistan, located in the region where the provinces of Punjab, Khyber Pakhtunkhwa, and Balochistan meet. Derajat is bound by the Indus River to the east, and the Sulaiman Mountains to the west.

The two major cities in the region are Dera Ghazi Khan (southwestern Punjab) and Dera Ismail Khan (southern Khyber Pakhtunkhwa). The Baloch towns of Dera Bugti, Dera Allah Yar and Dera Murad Jamali are adjacent to Derajat towards the southwest. The people of Derajat are called Derawal, and the varieties of Saraiki they speak are collectively called Derawali dialect, also known locally as Hindki''. Pashto and Balochi languages are spoken in the northern and western parts of Derajat, respectively.

Topography
The Derajat is a level plain between the Indus River and the Sulaiman Mountains, lying between 29°30′ and 34°15′ N. and 69°15′ and 72′ E., the name derives its name from, the three Deras : Dera Ismail Khan, Dera Fateh Khan, and Dera Ghazi Khan. It extends north to the Sheikh Badin National Park among the Sheikh Badin range, which divides it from the Marwat plain, and south to the town of Jampur, having a length of 325 miles and breadth of 50 miles.

History
The DeraJaat owes its existence as an historical area to the Baloch immigration in the fifteenth century. Sultan Husseyn of Langah Sultanate in Multan, being unable to hold his trans-Indus possessions, called in Baloch mercenaries, and assigned these territories to Malik Sohrab Dodai in jagir. Malik's sons, Ghazi Khan, Ismail Khan and Fateh Khan, founded the three Deras or 'settlements' named after them.

Mughal era
On Babar's conquest of Northern India in 1526 the Hooths submitted to him, and at his death the Derajat became a dependency of his son Kamran Mirza, the ruler of Kabul. Under Humayun the Baloch immigration increased, and they gradually pushed the Nahars farther south. All the Baloch tribes acknowledged the overlordship of the Hooth Nawabs, who ruled for about fifteen generations at Dera Ghazi Khan, taking alternately the style of 'Malik' and ` Ghazi Khan.' At Dera Ismail Khan ruled the Hooth Baloch chiefs, who bore the title of Ismail Khan from father to son and also held Darya Khan and Bhakkar, east of the Indus. Early in the eighteenth century the Hooths lost their supremacy, being overwhelmed by the Kalhora Dynasty Kalhoras of Sind.

Post Mughal era
In 1739 after Nadir Shah had defeated the Mughals and acquired all the territory west of the Indus, he made the Wazir, Mahmud Khan Gujar, governor in Dera Ghazi Khan under the Kalhora chief, who also became his vassal. Under Ahmad Shah Durrani the Kalhoras, now in a state of decadence, contended for possession of Dera Ghazi Khan, but Mahmud Khan Gujar appears to have been its real governor. He was succeeded by his nephew, who was killed in 1779, and the Durranis then appointed governors direct for a period of thirty-two years. Meanwhile, the last of the Hooth chiefs of Dera Ismail Khan had been deposed in 1770, and his territories also were administered from Kabul. In 1794 Humayun Shah attempted to deprive Zaman Shah Durrani of his kingdom, but he was defeated and fell into the hands of Muhammad Khan Sadozai, governor of the Sind Sagar Doab.

Sikh era
As a reward for this capture, Zaman Shah bestowed the province of Dera Ismail Khan on Nawab Muhammad Khan, who governed it from Mankera by deputy. His son-in-law, Hafiz Ahmad Khan, surrendered at Mankera to Ranjit Singh in 1821, and at the same time tribute was imposed by the Sikhs on the chiefs of Tank (Sarwar Khan) and Sagar. Dera Fateh Khan was also occupied; but Dera Ismail Khan, to which Hafiz Ahmad Khan was permitted to retire on the fall of Mankera, remained independent till 1836, when Nao Nihal Singh deposed Muhammad Khan, the son of Hafiz Ahmad Khan, and appointed Diwan Lakhi Mal to be Kardar. Diwan Lakhi Mal held this post till his death in 1843, and was succeeded by his son Diwan Daulat Rai, who enjoyed the support of the Multani Pathan Sardars. He was bitterly opposed by Malik Fateh Khan Tiwana, who had also procured a nomination as Kardar from the Sikh Durbar. H.E. Nawab Asadu'llah Khan. b. 1778, second son of Amir ul-Umara, Sardar Payinda Khan Muhammadzai, Sarfraz Khan, Chief of the Barakzai clan, by a Malikdinzai Barakzai lady. Governor of Derajat 1823

British era
These rivals contended for supremacy with varying success until 1847, when the Diwan then in possession was deposed on the recommendation of Herbert Edwardes, who appointed General Van Cortlandt to be Kardar. The Derajat passed to the British in 1849, and is now divided between the Districts of Dera Ghazi Khan in the Punjab and Dera Ismail Khan in the Khyber Pakhtunkhwa.

Post Independence
After the independence of Pakistan in 1947, many Muslim refugees from India settled in Derajat while most Hindus and Sikhs migrated to India. Many of Derajat's Hindu residents settled in the Derawal Nagar colony of Delhi, India, while others were dispersed around in the states of Haryana, Punjab and Uttar Pradesh.

Languages
The main languages in Derajat are Saraiki, Pashto, and Balochi. In addition, Urdu and English are also used.

References

External links

 
Saraikistan
Regions of Pakistan
Geography of Balochistan, Pakistan
Geography of Khyber Pakhtunkhwa
Geography of Punjab, Pakistan